Malins Plaisirs is the second album released by the Canadian trio, Genticorum. Their sound combines traditional (contemporary) Québécois music with several other genres of music. They won the Canadian Folk Music Award "Best Ensemble". Nominated for a 2006  Juno Award (Canada) and  Félix Award (Quebec).

Track listing
"les cousinages" - 3:52
"cascou" - 4:47
"le galant et la belle" - 4:02
"l'avocatier" - 3:56
"les tisserands" - 4:16
"méo grain d'or" - 6:41
"la belle en vous aimant" - 2:12
"suite de minuit" - 4:07
"méthé-métis" - 4:26
"le tic-tac du moulin" - 5:42
"bonnet d'âne" - 5:31
"le berger volage" - 5:17

References

2005 albums